Novinite is a Bulgarian English-language news provider based in Sofia. "Novinite" means "The News" in Bulgarian. It is also sometimes referred to as SNA by its forum users.
Through its website novinite.com/sofianewsagency.com and its Breaking News newsletter, Novinite.com provides coverage of events and developments in Bulgaria and around the world.

Novinite publishes Sofia Morning News, an online daily newspaper with paid subscription, and The Sofia Weekly, a free online weekly newspaper which comes out every Saturday.

Its website includes a forum, a free archive with more than 101,000 articles, a search engine, and news alerts.

Novinite is part of One Click Media Group.

History
Novinite was founded in 2001 by the Bulgarian journalist, businessman, and public relations expert, Maxim Behar. It was formally launched on March 11, 2001.

In addition to the website, Novinite's first online daily newspaper, Sofia Morning News (called Bulgarian Breaking News at the 
time), was launched on June 1, 2001.

Articles
 On December 21, 2008 Novinite published its 100,000th news article, an average of 35 news articles per day.
 The first news article published by Novinite was: "Radisson SAS Opens in Sofia" (March 11, 2001).
 Novinite's 10,000th news article was: "Israeli PM Ariel Sharon Won't Allow Ultra-Orthodox Parties to Rejoin Coalition" (May 22, 2002).
 Novinite's 50,000th news article was: "King's Party: Saxe-Coburg May Not Head Next Cabinet" (July 14, 2005).
 Novinite's 100,000th news article was about Novinite itself: "Novinite.com Becomes Media Partner of Invest in Bulgaria 2009 Business Summit" (December 21, 2008).

Coverage
The editorial team of Novinite provides news coverage in English of every aspect of contemporary Bulgaria including business and economy, politics, sports, society, culture, and lifestyle. Novinite features headlines covering the major world events and developments.

Novinite uses American English.

Readership
Novinite's readers include foreign businessmen and managers of multinational corporations doing or planning to do business in Bulgaria, diplomats in foreign embassies in Sofia and from all over the world, foreign citizens living in Bulgaria, foreign tourists, members of the Bulgarian immigrant communities around the world, and Bulgaria lovers.

External links
 Official website
 Official website of One Click Media Group

2001 establishments in Bulgaria
European news websites
English-language newspapers published in Europe
Mass media in Sofia
Daily newspapers published in Bulgaria
Publications established in 2001
Weekly newspapers published in Bulgaria